Enniscoffey is a civil parish in County Westmeath, Ireland.

Enniscoffey is one of 10 civil parishes in the barony of Fartullagh in the Province of Leinster.

Enniscoffey civil parish comprises 9 townlands: Ballintlevy, Bellfield aka Brannockstown, Blackislands aka Windmill, Brannockstown aka Bellfield, Caran aka Enniscoffey, Claremount aka Cummingstown, Gaybrook Demesne, Lemongrove aka Rathcam, and Mahonstown.

The neighbouring civil parishes are Lynn to the north, Killucan (barony of Farbill) to the east, Kilbride to the south and Pass of Kilbride and Moylisker to the west.

References

External links
Enniscoffey civil parish at the IreAtlas Townland Data Base
Enniscoffey civil parish at townlands.ie
Enniscoffey civil parish at the Placenames Database of Ireland

Civil parishes of County Westmeath